There are two species of lizard named copper anole:

 Anolis cupreus, found in Honduras, Nicaragua, and Costa Rica
 Anolis cuprinus, found in Mexico